This is a timeline documenting events of jazz in the year 1909.

Events
Tenor saxophonist Coleman Hawkins started playing the piano at the age of five years.

Standards

Births

 January
 13
 Danny Barker, American guitarist, banjoist, vocalist, and author (died 1994).
 Ed Burke, American violinist and trombonist (died 1988).
 15 – Gene Krupa, American jazz and big band drummer, band leader, actor, and composer (died 1973).
 22 – Mouse Randolph, American trumpeter (died 1997).
 24 – Tiny Winters, English bassist and vocalist (died 1996).

 February
 4 – Artie Bernstein, American upright bassist (died 1964).
 20 – Oscar Alemán, Argentine guitarist, singer, and dancer (died 1980).

 March
 2 – Narvin Kimball, American musician (died 2006).
 3 – Booker Pittman, American clarinetist (died 1969).
 9 – Herschel Evans, American tenor saxophonist (died 1939).
 21 – Miff Görling, Swedish bandleader, trombonist, arranger, and composer (died 1988).
 27 – Ben Webster, American tenor saxophonist (died 1973).

 April
 15 – Wilbert Baranco, American pianist and bandleader (died 1983).
 16 – Pippo Starnazza, Italian singer and actor (died 1975).
 29 – Jacques Butler, American trumpeter and vocalist (died 2003).

 May
 7 – Teddy Bunn, American guitarist, Spirits of Rhythm (died 1978).
 29 – Dick Stabile, American saxophonist and bandleader (died 1980).
 30 – Benny Goodman, American clarinetist and bandleader known as the "King of Swing" (died 1986).

 June
 8 – Henry Nemo, American musician, songwriter, and actor (died 1999).
 13 – Garland Wilson, American pianist (died 1954).
 27 – Leon Washington, American tenor saxophonist (died 1973).

 July
 16 – Teddy Buckner, American trumpeter (died 1994).
 22 – Cassino Simpson, American pianist (died 1952).

 August
 8 – Rupert Cole, Trinidadian alto saxophonist and clarinetist (died unknown date).
 10 – Claude Thornhill, American pianist, arranger, composer, and bandleader (died 1965).
 14 – Stuff Smith, American violinist (died 1967).
 17 – Larry Clinton, American bandleader and songwriter (died 1985).
 27 – Lester Young, American tenor saxophonist, clarinetist, composer, and bandleader (died 1959).

 September
 26 – Gus Deloof, Belgian trumpeter, composer, and arranger (died 1974).

 October
 4 – Buddy Featherstonhaugh, English saxophonist (died 1976).
 13
 Art Tatum, American pianist (died 1956).
 Scoville Browne, American reedist (died 1994).
 17 – Cozy Cole, American drummer (died 1981).

 December
 12 – Eddie Barefield, American saxophonist, clarinetist, and arranger (died 1991).
 17 – Roy McCloud, American cornetist (died 1986).
 31 – Jonah Jones, American trumpeter sometimes referred to as "King Louis II" (died 2000).

 Unknown date
 Roger Chaput, French guitarist and visual artist, Quintette du Hot Club de France (died 1995).
 Rudy Williams, American jazz alto saxophonist (died 1954).
 Tiny Davis, American trumpeter and vocalist (died 1994).

References

External links
 History Of Jazz Timeline: 1909 at All About Jazz

Jazz, 1909 In
Jazz by year